Hlavatce is a municipality and village in Tábor District in the South Bohemian Region of the Czech Republic. It has about 400 inhabitants.

Administrative parts
Villages of Debrník and Vyhnanice are administrative parts of Hlavatce.

References

Villages in Tábor District